David Abner Morse (31 May 1907 – 1 December 1990) was an American bureaucrat who headed the International Labour Organization.

Background
Born in New York on May 31, 1907, Morse graduated from Rutgers University in 1929, where he was a member of the Cap and Skull Society, and from the Harvard Law School in 1932. He was admitted to the New Jersey bar in 1932.

Career
Morse later became Special Assistant to the United States Attorney General, Chief Counsel of the Petroleum Labour Policy Board in the US Department of the Interior 1933-1935, and  Regional Attorney for the National Labour Relations Board in the metropolitan area of New York (1936-1937).

When war broke out, he gave up his law practice to join the army. From June 1943 to April 1944, Morse served as Captain in North Africa, Sicily and Italy, where he was appointed Chief of the Labor Division of the Allied Military Government (1945). He drafted and put into effect the labour policy and programme in Sicily and Italy for the British and United States Governments and armies. As Chief of the Labor Section of the US Group Control Council for Germany under Generals Eisenhower and Clay, he prepared the labor policy and program for Germany. Promoted to Lieutenant-Colonel, he was awarded the Legion of Merit for his army services in 1946.

After his discharge from the Army in 1945, Morse was appointed general counsel of the National Labor Relations Board. On July 1, 1946, President Truman named him Assistant Secretary of Labor, and Morse devoted his activities to the creation of the Department's programme of international affairs; he served as Acting Secretary from June 9 to August 2, 1948. 

Morse had been a delegate to the International Labour Organization (ILO) on two occasions and served as the United States Government representative on the Governing Body. In June 1948, he was named chief of the United States delegation to the International Labour Conference. At the 105th session of the Governing Body in San Francisco in June 1948, he was unanimously elected director-general for a ten-year term. He was unanimously re-elected for five-year terms in May 1957, in March 1962, and in February 1967. In 1969 the ILO was awarded the Nobel Prize for Peace. He resigned in February 1970. As Director-General, he was preceded by Edward J. Phelan and succeeded by C. Wilfred Jenks.

Death
David Abner Morse died in New York on December 1, 1990.

References

External links
 ILO website
 David A. Morse Papers at Seeley G. Mudd Manuscript Library, Princeton University
 David A. Morse Oral History Interviews (Truman Library)

1907 births
Rutgers University alumni
Harvard Law School alumni
United States Army Judge Advocate General's Corps
Recipients of the Legion of Merit
United States Army personnel of World War II
United States Army colonels
1990 deaths
International Labour Organization people
Lawyers who have represented the United States government
20th-century American lawyers
American officials of the United Nations